Dúbrava is a village and municipality in Snina District in the Prešov Region of north-eastern Slovakia.

History
In historical records the village was first mentioned in 1548.

Geography
The municipality lies at an altitude of 265 metres and covers an area of 9.478 km². It has a population of about 275 people.

The name of the village means an oak grove.

References

External links
 
https://web.archive.org/web/20071217080336/http://www.statistics.sk/mosmis/eng/run.html

Villages and municipalities in Snina District